Kibble may refer to:
 Dry compound feed, especially when used as dog food or cat food
 chalk and flint rubble, also known as kibble in East Devon, used to consolidate ground
 a large bucket, as used to raise ore from a mine shaft, see shaft mining
 a rock of crack cocaine
 kibbled wheat, a type of coarsely milled flour

People 
 Brendan Kibble (born 1963), Australian musician
 Bryan Kibble (1938–2016), British physicist and metrologist who invented the Kibble balance for measuring mass
 Chris Kibble (born 1963), British jazz musician
 George Kibble (1865–1923), English cricketer 
 Jack Kibble (John Westly Kibble; 1892–1969), American baseball player
 Karima Kibble (née Trotter; born 1974), American Gospel singer
 Nita Kibble (1879–1964), Australian librarian
 Tom W. B. Kibble (1932–2016), British theoretical physicist, interests included quantum field theory and topological defects
 Graham Kibble-White, British writer

Other uses 
 Kibble Palace, a greenhouse in Glasgow
 Nita Kibble Literary Award, an Australian literary award for biographical or life writing
 Kibble balance, an electromechanical weight measuring instrument

See also
 Kibbles (disambiguation)
 George Kibbler (c. 1900–1929), English rugby league footballer of the 1920s